This list of churches in Hjørring Municipality lists church buildings in Hjørring Municipality, Denmark.

List

Church of Denmark 
These churches are part of the Church of Denmark:

Other denominations

References 

Hjørring
Churches